John Cowan (born 1952) is an American musician.

John Cowan may also refer to:

Politics and law
John Cowan, Lord Cowan (1798–1878), Senator of the College of Justice in Scotland
Sir John Cowan (sheriff) (died 1842), Lord Mayor of London
John Cowan (Newfoundland politician) (1847–1927), politician in Newfoundland
John F. Cowan (1858–1917), North Dakota lawyer, politician, Attorney General, and judge
Sir John Cowan (South Australian politician) (1866–1953), Australian politician
John Lancelot Cowan (1893–1971), Australian politician

Science and medicine
John Black Cowan (1828–1896), professor of medicine at the University of Glasgow
John Cowan (physician) (fl. 1870s), American physician and phrenologist
John Macqueen Cowan (1892–1960), Scottish botanist

Sports
John Cowan (footballer, born 1870) (1870–1937), Scottish footballer
Johnnie Cowan (1913–1993), American baseball player
John Cowan (footballer, born 1949), Northern Ireland international footballer

Others
Sir John Cowan, 1st Baronet (1814–1900), of the Cowan baronets, philanthropist
John Cowan (steel merchant) (1844–1929), Scottish iron and steel merchant
John Cowan (photographer) (1929–1979), British fashion photographer
John Cowan (RAN officer) (born 1957), Australian navy officer
John W. Cowan, American computer programmer

See also
Jon Cowan, American television producer and writer
Jack Cowan (1927–2000), footballer
John Cowans (1862–1921), Quartermaster-General to the Forces
John Kissig Cowen (1844–1904), American railroad executive and congressman
Cowan (surname)
Cowan (disambiguation)